Harpreet Singh (born 1 November 2002) is an Indian professional footballer who plays as a centre back for Indian Arrows in the I-League.

Career 
Harpreet, with other three footballers was brought to the Ozone F.C. residential academy from Dibbipura, 50 km off Amritsar, Punjab in 2016. Harpreet was signed by Indian Arrows in 2019–20 season. 
He made his professional debut for the Indian Arrows side against Punjab F.C. on 16 December 2019, He started and played full match as Indian Arrows lost 1–0.

Career statistics

References

2002 births
Living people
People from Amritsar
Indian footballers
Indian Arrows players
Footballers from Punjab, India
I-League players
India youth international footballers
Association football central defenders